Carlos Akapo Martínez (born 12 March 1993) is an Equatoguinean professional footballer who plays for Major League Soccer club San Jose Earthquakes and the Equatorial Guinea national team as a right-back or central defender.

Club career
Akapo was born in Elche, Province of Alicante, to an Equatoguinean father and a Spanish mother. He played youth football with four clubs, including Hércules CF and Elche CF, and finished his development also in the Valencian Community with Huracán Valencia CF. He made his senior debut with the latter on 22 January 2012, in a 2–1 home loss against RCD Mallorca B.

On 11 July 2013, Akapo signed a two-year contract with Segunda División side CD Numancia. His first game as a professional took place on 25 August, as he started in a 4–2 home win over Real Jaén.

On 6 August 2014, Akapo joined Valencia CF and was assigned to the reserves in the third tier. After two seasons of relative playing time, he returned to division two after agreeing to a three-year deal at SD Huesca on 14 June 2016.

Akapo was regularly used the following campaigns, and contributed 20 appearances in 2017–18 as the club achieved a first-ever promotion to La Liga. He made his debut in the competition on 25 September 2018, replacing Luisinho in a 3–0 defeat at Atlético Madrid.

On 20 June 2019, after suffering immediate relegation, Akapo signed a three-year contract with Cádiz CF of the second division, as a free agent. He featured sparingly in his first season at the Estadio Ramón de Carranza, in a promotion as runners-up.

Akapo scored his first goal in the Spanish top tier – also his first as a senior – on 21 May 2021, his team's second in the 2–2 away draw against Levante UD. On 5 August 2022, he joined Major League Soccer side San Jose Earthquakes on a one-and-half year deal.

International career
Akapo received his first call from Equatorial Guinea in late August 2012, for a 2013 Africa Cup of Nations qualifying match against Congo DR the following month. He did not leave the bench in the 4–0 loss, making his debut on 5 June 2013 in a friendly with Togo.

Akapo's first major tournament was the 2021 Africa Cup of Nations, delayed due to the COVID-19 pandemic. He played all the minutes but one in Cameroon to help his team reach the quarter-finals; in the round of 16 against Mali, he converted his attempt in the penalty shootout.

Personal life
Akapo's younger brother, Javier, is also a defender and an international for Equatorial Guinea.

Career statistics

Club

International

Scores and results list Equatorial Guinea's goal tally first, score column indicates score after each Akapo goal.

References

External links

1993 births
Living people
Citizens of Equatorial Guinea through descent
Equatoguinean sportspeople of Spanish descent
Spanish sportspeople of Equatoguinean descent
Equatoguinean footballers
Spanish footballers
Footballers from Elche
Association football defenders
La Liga players
Segunda División players
Segunda División B players
Huracán Valencia CF players
CD Numancia players
Valencia CF Mestalla footballers
SD Huesca footballers
Cádiz CF players
Major League Soccer players
San Jose Earthquakes players
Equatorial Guinea international footballers
2021 Africa Cup of Nations players
Equatoguinean expatriate footballers
Spanish expatriate footballers
Expatriate soccer players in the United States
Equatoguinean expatriate sportspeople in the United States
Spanish expatriate sportspeople in the United States